CDC42 binding protein kinase beta is a protein that in humans is encoded by the CDC42BPB gene.

Function

This gene encodes a member of the serine/threonine protein kinase family. The encoded protein contains a Cdc42/Rac-binding p21 binding domain resembling that of PAK kinase. The kinase domain of this protein is most closely related to that of myotonic dystrophy kinase-related ROK. Studies of the similar gene in rats suggested that this kinase may act as a downstream effector of Cdc42 in cytoskeletal reorganization.

References

Further reading